The IWI Tavor TS12 is an Israeli semi-automatic bullpup shotgun, based on the IWI Tavor assault rifle. The Tavor TS12 is designed and produced by Israel Weapon Industries (IWI). The TS12 was the best selling semi-automatic shotgun on GunBroker.com in 2020.

History 
In January 2018, the TS12, which was the first bullpup shotgun developed by IWI, was revealed at SHOT Show, and released on the market the same year.

Design 
The TS12 loads its shells into three magazine tubes, each of which contain a total of five shells, allowing for a maximum of 15 + 1 shells. The tubes can be rotated via a button on the pistol grip.

The TS12 has a Picatinny rail, with receptacles on both the left and right.

References

External links
 Official webpage

Firearms of Israel
Semi-automatic shotguns
Bullpup shotguns
Weapons and ammunition introduced in 2018